Queensland State League may refer to:

 Queensland State League (association football), a statewide semi-professional association football league
 Queensland State League (Australian rules football), a Brisbane-based semi-professional Australian rules football league
Queensland State League (basketball), a statewide semi-professional basketball league